Highlights FC, known as SL Horsford Highlights FC for sponsorship reasons, is a Nevisian association football club based in Charlestown. The team is the most successful team in the Nevis Premier Division winning the title four times.

Honors 
 N1 League: 5
2005–06, 2007–08, 2008–09, 2013–14, 2016–17

References 

Highlights
2004 establishments in Saint Kitts and Nevis